Hiram Reynolds Bloomer (December 19, 1845 – 1910 or June 3, 1911) was an American painter.

In 1872 Bloomer was a founding member of the Bohemian Club of San Francisco. In 1874 he moved to Paris, France, where he exhibited in the 1877 salon. He returned to the United States in 1880, moving first to New York, and then California two years later.

His work is included in the collection of Emery Walker House, Oxford.

References

19th-century American painters
20th-century American painters
Painters from New York City
1845 births
1910 deaths